Manuela Alexandra González Mendoza (born 29 August 1995) is a Colombian footballer who plays as a forward. She is a member of the Colombia women's national football team. She was part of the team at the 2015 FIFA Women's World Cup. On club level she plays for CD Palmiranas in Colombia.

González finished joint top-scorer of the 2016 Copa Libertadores Femenina.

Competitions Played 

 Copa America Women(3)

1

RES

References

1995 births
Living people
Colombian women's footballers
Colombia women's international footballers
Place of birth missing (living people)
2015 FIFA Women's World Cup players
Women's association football forwards
21st-century Colombian women